Aribwaung (Aribwaungg), also known as Yalu (Jaloc), is an Austronesian language of Morobe Province, Papua New Guinea. It is spoken in the single village of Yalu in Wampar Rural LLG.

References

Markham languages
Languages of Morobe Province